The UCSD Guardian is a student-operated newspaper at the University of California, San Diego. Originally named the Triton Times, it is published once a week during the regular academic year, usually Mondays. Although The Guardian is officially a university department, it is funded solely by advertising. Unlike many college newspapers, The Guardian has no faculty advisor and is not formally tied to any academic program.

Staff structure 
The Guardian's editorial staff consists of UCSD undergraduates. The Editor in Chief is elected in the late spring by a vote of the current year's staff; the Editor in Chief-elect then selects new senior editors, who make up the paper's Executive Board, which is ratified by the outgoing editors.

In contrast, the paper's business side is operated by several longtime university employees. A Business Oversight Board, which includes the paper's general manager, Editor in Chief, and managing editors, is responsible for setting long-term policies for the business and overseeing their implementation.

University relationship 
Though The Guardian is technically a self-supporting enterprise under the university's Student Affairs department, it operates with complete independence and autonomy from the university. Under the paper's constitution, the Executive Board operates as the sole publisher of the paper. The newspaper's student editors have formally resolved to cease its production and operations in the case of any university interference.

Recent history 
In recent years, the paper has undergone a series of crises and resulting restructurings. Between 2001 and 2004, The Guardian saw its annual revenue plunge, from above $400,000 to less than $320,000. The resulting budget deficits nearly wiped out the paper's financial reserves and resulted in page reductions for its editorial operations.

As part of an effort to stop the bleeding, the paper's general manager implemented a strict 50-50 division between editorial content and advertising. The Executive Board of the paper responded to the crisis by carrying out a reorganization of the business department and a reduction in the compensation of its student staff.

Editorial success 
Throughout the years, The Guardian has won many local, regional, statewide, and national awards. In 2006, The Guardian won nearly a dozen and a half awards from the California College Media Association, in categories ranging from design and illustration to writing and photography. Shortly after, the paper was also named an honorable mention in the competition to be named Newspaper of the Year by the Associated Collegiate Press.

In 2020, The Guardian won several awards from the San Diego Society of Professional Journalists, including second place for Best College Newspaper, first place for Best Arts & Entertainment Story in a College Publication, and third place for Best Opinion in a College Publication. The Guardian also won several awards from the San Diego Press Club, including first place for Best Column in a College Publication, second place for Best Investigative Reporting in a College Publication, and an honorable mention for Best Student Newspaper.

While UCSD does not have a journalism program, many former Guardian writers and editors have launched journalism careers. Guardian alumni have worked or currently work for major newspapers (including The Wall Street Journal, the Orange County Register, Kansas City Star, the Seattle Post-Intelligencer, The San Diego Union-Tribune, the Riverside Press-Enterprise, The Torrance Daily Breeze, The Christian Science Monitor, Investor's Business Daily, LA Weekly, SF Weekly and the Los Angeles Times), magazines (including Newsweek, Vanity Fair, Flaunt and Macworld), and television news stations (KGTV-San Diego). In 2006, an alumnus was nominated for the Academy Award in the Documentary Short category.

Change in frequency 
During fall quarter 1990, The Guardian published three issues a week, on Mondays, Wednesdays, and Fridays. Due to a lack of advertising revenue and the increased production and distribution costs of a third issue of the newspaper, the paper reverted to a twice-weekly schedule during winter quarter 1991. The Guardian was published twice weekly, on Mondays and Thursdays, until winter quarter 2017, when the switch to a weekly schedule was made.

At the beginning of spring quarter 2020, The Guardian temporarily ceased its print publication and made the transition to release all content on its website and in a weekly newsletter. This change was made due to the ongoing COVID-19 pandemic. The Guardian returned to print at the beginning of the Fall quarter in 2021-22.

Editors-in-chief 

 2022-2023: Jocelyn Brossia
 2021-2022: Zara Irshad
 2020-2021: Jahfreen Alam
 2019-2020: Daisy Scott
 2018-2019: Chris Robertson
 2017-2018: Samuel Velazquez
 2016-2017: Fall: Tina Butoiu; Winter and Spring: Rosina Garcia and Marcus Thuillier
 2015-2016: Vincent Pham
 2014-2015: Fall: Zev Hurwitz; Winter and Spring: Aleksandra Konstantinovic
 2013-2014: Fall and Winter: Laira Martin; Spring: Zev Hurwitz
 2012-2013: Fall: Angela Chen Winter: Arielle Sallai Spring: Laira Martin
 2011-2012: Angela Chen
 2010-2011: Angela Chen
 2009-2010: Simone Wilson
 2008-2009: Matthew McArdle
 2007-2008: Charles Nguyen
 2006-2007: Heather Welles
 2005-2006: Grant Schrader
 2004-2005: Clayton Worfolk
 2003-2004: Evan McLaughlin
 2002-2003: Josh Crouse
 2001-2002: Alison Norris and Jeffrey White
 2000-2001: Vincent Gragnani
 1999-2000: Marc Comer and Julia Kulla-Mader
 1998-1999: Walt Dickinson
 1997-1998: Terry Lew
 1996-1997: Chris Schreiber
 1995-1996: Tedd Ladd
 1994-1995: Doug Alexander
 1993-1994: Eric Schmidt
 1992-1993: Ben Boychuk
 1991-1992: Jason Snell
 1990-1991: Phil Gruen
 1989-1990: Seth Slater
 1988-1989: John Shaw
 1987-1988: Niki Newlands
 1986-1987:
 1985-1986: Phil Willon
 1984-1985:
 1983-1984: Tim August
 1982-1983:
 1981-1982: Peter Mortensen
 1980-1981: Kathy Huffer
 1979-1980: Eric Jaye
 1977-1978: Alan Russell
 1976-1977: David Eisen
 1974-1976: John H. Taylor

The Disreguardian 
In the early 1980s The Guardian published several April Fool's Day issues, titled The Disreguardian. The practice stopped at some point, but was revived on April 1, 1990, a decision that resulted in Editor-in-Chief Seth Slater's resignation in protest. The April Fool's issues continue to this day.

References

External links 

Guardian, UCSD
Newspapers published in San Diego
Student newspapers published in California